Mecyna lutealis is a species of moth of the family Crambidae. It is found in large parts of Europe, including Spain, France, Belgium, Germany, Switzerland, Austria, Italy, Romania, Bulgaria, North Macedonia, Albania and Greece. The species was first described by Philogène Auguste Joseph Duponchel in 1833.

External links
 European distribution

Spilomelinae
Moths of Europe
Moths described in 1833
Insects of Turkey